Lipid IVA 4-amino-4-deoxy-L-arabinosyltransferase (undecaprenyl phosphate-alpha-L-Ara4N transferase, 4-amino-4-deoxy-L-arabinose lipid A transferase, polymyxin resistance protein PmrK, arnT (gene)) is an enzyme with systematic name 4-amino-4-deoxy-alpha-L-arabinopyranosyl ditrans, octacis-undecaprenyl phosphate:lipid IVA 4-amino-4-deoxy-L-arabinopyranosyltransferase. This enzyme catalyses the following chemical reaction

 (1) 4-amino-4-deoxy-alpha-L-arabinopyranosyl ditrans, octacis-undecaprenyl phosphate + alpha-Kdo-(2->4)-alpha-Kdo-(2->6)-lipid A  alpha-Kdo-(2->4)-alpha-Kdo-(2->6)-[4-P-L-Ara4N]-lipid A + ditrans, octacis-undecaprenyl phosphate
 (2) 4-amino-4-deoxy-alpha-L-arabinopyranosyl ditrans, octacis-undecaprenyl phosphate + lipid IVA  lipid IIA + ditrans, octacis-undecaprenyl phosphate
 (3) 4-amino-4-deoxy-alpha-L-arabinopyranosyl ditrans, octacis-undecaprenyl phosphate + alpha-Kdo-(2->4)-alpha-Kdo-(2->6)-lipid IVA  4'-alpha-L-Ara4N-alpha-Kdo-(2->4)-alpha-Kdo-(2->6)-lipid IVA + ditrans, octacis-undecaprenyl phosphate

This integral membrane protein is present in the inner membrane of certain Gram negative endobacteria.

References

External links 
 

EC 2.4.2